Graig R. Meyer (born July 5, 1974) is an American politician serving as a Democratic member of the North Carolina Senate. He has represented the 23rd district (which includes all of Orange, Caswell, and Person counties) since 2023. He previously served as a member of the North Carolina House of Representatives, where he was elected to the 50th district seat 4 times. In 2022, Meyer announced his candidacy for District 23 of the North Carolina Senate, that district includes all of Caswell, Orange and Person counties, and was elected to that seat in November 2022.

Early life
Meyer, the son of two politically engaged social workers, was raised in the inner city of Cleveland, Ohio. He was a Phi Beta Kappa graduate of the College of Wooster, before going on to acquire a master's degree in social work from the University of Chicago.

Career
Prior to joining the House, Rep. Meyer spent sixteen years working in public schools working primarily on initiatives designed to promote educational equity. From 1998 through 2014, he was the coordinator of the Blue Ribbon Mentor-Advocate program. From 2012 through 2014, he also served as the Director of Student Equity for the Chapel Hill-Carrboro City Schools.  In 2018, Meyer co-authored More Than a Mentoring Program. The book offers real-world perspective and advice on challenging systemic racism in schools.

When then-Rep. Valerie Foushee was appointed to the Senate in 2013, Meyer was selected by a local Democratic Party committee to hold the rest of her term.  He was reelected in 2014 and 2016, running against Rod Chaney in both elections.

During his time in the legislature, Meyer has established himself as a strong advocate for improving public education.  In addition, he has worked as the founding Co-Chair of two bipartisan legislative caucuses, the Early Childhood Caucus and the Life Sciences Caucus. He has been recognized by both the League of Conservation Voters and the Young Democrats of North Carolina for his legislative leadership.

Meyer also works as a co-founder and principal consultant with The Equity Collaborative, LLC.

Electoral history

2022

2020

2018

2016

2014

Committee assignments

2021-2022 Session
Appropriations 
Appropriations - Information Technology 
Appropriations 
Education - K-12 
Homeland Security, Military, and Veterans Affairs 
Regulatory Reform

2019-2020 Session
Alcoholic Beverage Control
Education - K-12 
Homeland Security, Military, and Veterans Affairs 
Regulatory Reform
Finance

2017-2018 Session
Education - K-12
Homeland Security, Military, and Veterans Affairs
Finance
Judiciary I
Aging

2015-2016 Session
Education - K-12
Homeland Security, Military, and Veterans Affairs
Regulatory Reform
Finance
Aging
Public Utilities

References

External links
Facebook page

|-

Living people
1974 births
People from Cleveland
People from Hillsborough, North Carolina
College of Wooster alumni
University of Chicago alumni
21st-century American politicians
Democratic Party members of the North Carolina House of Representatives
Democratic Party North Carolina state senators